Milk Teeth (often stylised as MILK TEETH) were a British punk rock band from Stroud, Gloucestershire, which formed in May 2013. The band announced their split on Facebook and Twitter on 4 September 2020.

History

Formation and early years
The band began writing music together in early 2013 and released their first EP, Smiling Politely, independently in August 2013. After signing to Hopeless, the band released their second EP Sad Sack in April 2015. On 5 January 2016, after they finished recording their debut album, founding member and guitarist/primary songwriter and occasional lead vocalist Josh Bannister left the band and was replaced by former Hindsights member Billy Hutton as a touring guitarist. The band then released their debut album, Vile Child, on 29 January 2016, through Hopeless Records. This was the last of the band's releases to feature Bannister. In April 2016 the band toured the US, supporting Sorority Noise, Citizen and Turnover. In 2017 the band signed to Roadrunner Records and announced a new EP titles Be Nice, which was released in July 2017, followed up by Go Away, another EP released in November 2017.

2018–2020
On 26 June 2018 it was announced via the band's Facebook page that guitarist Chris Webb would be leaving the band "with immediate effect"  following relationship issues with the lead singer. Em Foster from Nervus filled in on guitar shortly afterwards. After a number of festival dates, on 19 September 2018, the band announced that Billy Hutton was leaving Milk Teeth and confirmed Foster as a full time member, resulting in the band becoming a  three piece. This lineup played the EP's Be Nice and Go Away in full, on a short tour around the UK in November of that year, preceding the release of a new single; Stain, and a run supporting Enter Shikari during their "Stop The Clocks" tour in December.

Milk Teeth began 2019 by supporting PUP, on their "Morbid Stuff Tour-pocalypse" tour in April. Performances at several UK festivals followed, including 2000 Trees, Boomtown Fair, Truck Festival and Camden Rocks. After signing to a new label, Music For Nations, the band performed main stage sets at the Reading and Leeds Festivals. Shortly afterwards, drummer Oli Holbrook left Milk Teeth, being replaced by Nervus drummer Jack Kenny, leaving Blomfield as the sole original member of the lineup. Following this change, Milk Teeth once again embarked on a short UK tour with Cultdreams and Nervus, in support of their latest single, Given Up, which was released on 11 October 2019. The following month, Milk Teeth released another single entitled Destroyer, on 29 November.

On 17 January 2020, Milk Teeth officially announced their self-titled second album, which was released on 27 March.

On 4 September 2020, Milk Teeth announced that they had split up.

Discography

Studio albums

Extended Plays

Singles
"Nearby Catfight" was released as a single ahead of the release of the Be Nice EP and reached number 5 on the Kerrang! Rock Chart in October 2017. The band's first single as a trio, "Stain" was released in December 2018, debuting at 12 in the Kerrang! Rock Chart.

Band members

Final line-up
 Becky Blomfield – vocals, bass guitar (2013–2020)
 Em Foster - vocals, lead guitar (2018–2020)
 Jack Kenny - drums, percussion (2019–2020)

Former members
 Josh Bannister – vocals, lead guitar (2013-2016)
 Chris Webb - guitar (2013-2018)
 Billy Hutton – vocals, lead guitar (2016–2018)
 Oli Holbrook – drums, percussion (2013–2019)

Timeline

References

Musical groups established in 2013
Musical groups disestablished in 2020
Hopeless Records artists
Music for Nations artists
Roadrunner Records artists
2013 establishments in England